Irazema González Martínez Olivares (born 19 April 1974) is a Mexican politician affiliated with the PRI. She currently serves as Deputy of the LXII Legislature of the Mexican Congress representing the State of Mexico.

References

1974 births
Living people
Politicians from the State of Mexico
Women members of the Chamber of Deputies (Mexico)
Members of the Chamber of Deputies (Mexico)
Institutional Revolutionary Party politicians
21st-century Mexican politicians
21st-century Mexican women politicians
Deputies of the LXII Legislature of Mexico